Cornești is a commune in Dâmbovița County, Muntenia, Romania with a population of 7,551 people. It is composed of ten villages: Bujoreanca, Cătunu, Cornești, Cristeasca, Crivățu, Frasinu, Hodărăști, Ibrianu, Postârnacu and Ungureni.

References

Communes in Dâmbovița County
Localities in Muntenia